Pakundia Adarsha Mohila College is a higher secondary and undergraduate college for girls in Pakundia, Kishoreganj, Dhaka Division, Bangladesh. The educational institution was established in 1993 as the first women's degree college in Pakundia. It offers the 11th–12th grade and undergraduate education. National University affiliated degree (pass) and honours courses are available in this college.

The college is located in the Pakundia Municipality area. It is controlled by the Board of Intermediate and Secondary Education, Dhaka. Its campus is spread across nearly three acres of land.

History 
Former Bangladesh Deputy Minister of Shipping and Jatiya Sangsad member ABM Zahidul Haq founded the college in 1993. It started journey as a non-government educational institution and later gained the MPO status. Its establishment marked the founding of the first girls' degree college in Pakundia.

Administration 

The college is under the control of the Dhaka Education Board and affiliated to the National University of Bangladesh. Its Educational Institution Identification Number (EIIN) is 110616. The current principal of the college is Md. Muzzammal Haque. Before him, Md. Jasim Uddin served as the principal of the college.

Academics

Admission 
Only girls are allowed to be admitted to the college in the 11th grade and undergraduate level. The 11th grade admission process starts right after the publication of the Secondary School Certificate (SSC) results and students are selected on the basis of their SSC results. A maximum of 300 students can be admitted in the 11th grade under the Dhaka Education Board in this college.

For the National University affiliated programs, students are selected on the basis of their SSC and Higher Secondary Certificate (HSC) results.

Curriculum 
 Higher Secondary Certificate (HSC):
 Science
 Humanities
 Business studies
 Degree (pass) courses:
 BA (pass)
 BSS (pass)
 Honours courses:
 Bangla
 Social work
 HSC (BM) under the Bangladesh Technical Education Board:
 Accounting
 Computer operation

Extracurricular activities 

Pakundia Adarsha Mohila College organizes various extracurricular programs every year besides academic activities. The college has an auditorium at which different kinds of seminars are held throughout the year, including seminars on higher education, and seminars on the Bangladesh Liberation War. Other extracurricular activities include holding freshers' receptions, organizing food festivals, and holding farewell ceremonies.

See also 
 Directorate of Secondary and Higher Education
 Education in Bangladesh
 Ministry of Education (Bangladesh)
 National Curriculum and Textbook Board
 Secondary and Higher Education Division

References

External links 
 
 

1993 establishments in Bangladesh
Colleges affiliated to National University, Bangladesh
Colleges in Kishoreganj District
Educational institutions established in 1993
Women's universities and colleges in Bangladesh